The 2019 Jiangsu Suning F.C. season was Jiangsu Suning's 11th consecutive season in the Chinese Super League since it started in the 2004 season, and its 11th consecutive season in the top flight of Chinese football. This season Shandong Luneng Taishan participated in the Chinese Super League and Chinese FA Cup.

Transfers and loans

Squad

First team

Reserve squad

Squad statistics

Appearances and goals

|-
! colspan=14 style=background:#dcdcdc; text-align:center| Players transferred out during the season

Disciplinary record

Friendlies

Pre-season

Competitions

Chinese Super League

Table

Results summary

Results by round

Matches
All times are local (UTC+8).

Chinese FA Cup

References

Jiangsu F.C. seasons
Jiangsu